The Liberty Historic District is a historic district in Liberty, Tennessee, United States. Buildings in the historic district include Liberty High School, the Salem Baptist Church and cemetery, and a number of private homes.

References

Historic districts on the National Register of Historic Places in Tennessee
Geography of DeKalb County, Tennessee
National Register of Historic Places in DeKalb County, Tennessee